The Malibu Times is the local newspaper in Malibu, California.

History
The newspaper was founded in 1946 by Reeves Templeman. His wife Reta edited it with him. In November 1987, Arnold and Karen York purchased The Malibu Times from the Templeman family. 

The Malibu Times also publishes the Malibu Times Magazine, "a lifestyle publication featuring homes, fashions, food, profiles of Malibu residents and more," which circulates 25,000 copies around the Malibu area. The first issue, published November–December 2003 featured actress Jane Seymour on the cover, and many other local Malibu celebrities have graced the covers since.

The York Era 

In 1987, Arnold and Karen York purchased The Malibu Times newspaper and carried the torch during a 34-year tenure at the helm of the publication. During their time, Arnold York wrote a polarizing publisher's letter, the Yorks launched the lifestyle periodical Malibu Times Magazine in 2003, and a travel guide called What to do in Malibu in 2019.

In November 2021, the Yorks sold The Malibu Times newspaper and magazine to Nicholas and Hayley Mattson, owners of 13 Stars.

References

External links

Newspapers published in Greater Los Angeles
Malibu, California
Publications established in 1946
1946 establishments in California